Ekaterina Viktorovna Murugova (born 1973) is a former pair skater who competed internationally for the Soviet Union. With partner Artem Torgashev, she is a two-time World Junior medalist. Murugova joined the Russian Ice Stars company.

Results
(with Torgashev)

References

Soviet female pair skaters
Living people
1973 births
World Junior Figure Skating Championships medalists